I'm Glad I Can Make You Cry is a World War I song written and composed by Charles R. McCarron and Carey Morgan. The song was published in 1918 by Jos. W. Stern & Co. in New York, NY. The sheet music cover, illustrated by Starmer, depicts photos of Alice Joyce & Evart Overton, as well as Bessie Hamilton and Gus Hall's Minstrels.

The sheet music can be found at the Pritzker Military Museum & Library.

References 

Bibliography
Parker, Bernard S. World War I Sheet Music 1. Jefferson: McFarland & Company, Inc., 2007. . 

1918 songs
Songs of World War I
Songs written by Carey Morgan
Songs with music by Charles McCarron